AviaSelva was a Peruvian airline headquartered in Iquitos, Peru. Their main hub was at the Crnl. FAP Francisco Secada Vignetta International Airport in that same city.  Most of their destinations were chartered. It operated interdepartmental flights in Peru, Brazil and Colombia.

History
The airline operated between 2007 and 2008.

Fleet
They operated Cessna 206 aircraft.

Destinations
 Peru:
 Iquitos – Coronel FAP Francisco Secada Vignetta International Airport
 Juanjuí – Juanjuí Airport
 Pucallpa – Capitán Rolden International Airport
 Tarapoto – Comandante FAP Guillermo del Castillo Paredes Airport
 Yurimaguas – Moisés Benzaquén Rengifo Airport
 Colombia:
 Leticia – Alfredo Vásquez Cobo International Airport

References

Defunct airlines of Peru
Airlines established in 2007
Airlines disestablished in 2008